James E. Price (born November 27, 1949) is an American former professional basketball player and coach.

Career
He played college basketball for the Louisville Cardinals and was selected by the Los Angeles Lakers in the second round of the 1972 NBA draft. Price played seven seasons in the National Basketball Association (NBA) from 1972 to 1979, spending time with the Lakers, Milwaukee Bucks, Buffalo Braves, Denver Nuggets and Detroit Pistons. He was named an All-Star in 1975, after he was traded midseason from the Lakers to the Bucks for Lucius Allen.

Playing with his older brother Mike Price, Jim Price helped lead his Arsenal Technical High School basketball team to the State Finals in 1966; the Titans finished the season with a 25–4 record. He was inducted into the Indiana Basketball Hall of Fame in 2008.

Price entered the coaching ranks following his playing career; he spent 5 years as the head coach of the IUPUI Jaguars women's team, totaling a record of 73–55 and 3 NAIA post-season berths.

NBA career statistics

Regular season

Playoffs

References

External links
Career Stats

1949 births
Living people
African-American basketball coaches
African-American basketball players
All-American college men's basketball players
American men's basketball coaches
American men's basketball players
Arsenal Technical High School alumni
Basketball coaches from Kentucky
Basketball players from Kentucky
Buffalo Braves players
Continental Basketball Association coaches
Denver Nuggets players
Detroit Pistons players
Los Angeles Lakers draft picks
Los Angeles Lakers players
Louisville Cardinals men's basketball players
Milwaukee Bucks players
National Basketball Association All-Stars
People from Russellville, Kentucky
Point guards
21st-century African-American people
20th-century African-American sportspeople
IUPUI Jaguars women's basketball coaches